Jones City is an unincorporated community in Putnam County, in the U.S. state of Ohio.

History
Jones City was platted in 1890. The community was named after Evan H. Jones, a first settler. Little remains of the original community.

References

Unincorporated communities in Putnam County, Ohio
Unincorporated communities in Ohio